Sergey Viktorovich Semenov (born 10 August 1995) is a Russian Greco-Roman wrestler who competed at the 2016 Olympic Games in the 130 kg weight category. In the semifinals he lost to Mijaín López of Cuba (0–3). In the bronze medal match he beat Heiki Nabi of Estonia (6–0). Semenov won the 2017 U23 World Championships. He is a 2017 World Cup gold medalist and a two-time silver medalist. Semenov won the 2018 World Wrestling Championships defeating American Adam Coon in the final, 9–0.

In 2020, he won the gold medal in the 130 kg event at the 2020 Individual Wrestling World Cup held in Belgrade, Serbia. In March 2021, he qualified at the European Qualification Tournament to compete at the 2020 Summer Olympics in Tokyo, Japan. He won one of the bronze medals in the men's 130 kg event.

References

External links
 Sergey Semenov at the official website of the Russian Wrestling Federation
 

Russian male sport wrestlers
1995 births
Olympic wrestlers of Russia
Living people
Wrestlers at the 2016 Summer Olympics
Medalists at the 2016 Summer Olympics
Olympic bronze medalists for Russia
Olympic bronze medalists for the Russian Olympic Committee athletes
Olympic medalists in wrestling
Russian sportspeople in doping cases
World Wrestling Championships medalists
Wrestlers at the 2015 European Games
European Games silver medalists for Russia
Wrestlers at the 2019 European Games
European Games medalists in wrestling
European Wrestling Championships medalists
Wrestlers at the 2020 Summer Olympics
Medalists at the 2020 Summer Olympics
Sportspeople from Tula, Russia
20th-century Russian people
21st-century Russian people